I Am Nasrine  is a 2012 British-Iranian drama film written and directed by Tina Gharavi. The film was nominated at the 66th British Academy Film Awards for Outstanding Debut by a British Writer, Director or Producer.

Story

I Am Nasrine: a coming-of-age story set against the modern refugee experience.

I Am Nasrine: A film about love, finding oneself and the eternal search for home. Events throw Nasrine's world into turmoil as circumstances beyond her control change her life forever. In this coming of age story we meet a young woman who is doing her best to understand herself, deal with the consequences of the politics around her and find a better world.

When you change where you are do you change who you are? I Am Nasrine is an intimate journey of self-discovery and ultimately reveals the unfolding of a soul. Set in modern-day Tehran, and the UK, the film follows the paths of Nasrine and Ali, sister and brother in a comfortable, middle class Iranian home. When Nasrine has a run-in with the police, the punishment is more than she bargained for. At her father's bidding, Nasrine and Ali set out for the UK, torn about leaving behind their home and all that they know, embarking on a reluctant exile. Still, for Nasrine, there is undeniable excitement about the prospect of starting a new life in the West, and an eagerness for its promise of new freedoms. Arriving in Britain, their fate and their future are far from certain. Nasrine is quick to settle into her new life, making friends, forming bonds, including Nichole from the gypsy/travelers community. All the while her brother Ali struggles with the realities of life in the UK and his awakening sexuality. Then comes 9/11. Their parents will be unable to join them in Britain, leaving them quite alone. Things spiral further out of control when an unimaginable tragedy occurs. Nasrine must discover an incredible courage within her to accept what fate has dealt her; discovering that the end of her journey is really just the beginning. Can hope, simple untainted hope, overcome the darkest of tragedies? I Am Nasrine explores these questions and more, and offers answers that are sure to surprise.

References

External links
  
 
 
 

2012 films
Iranian drama films
2010s Persian-language films
Films set in Iran
Films shot in Iran
British drama films
2012 drama films
2010s British films